Stockmann is a Finnish company.

Stockmann may also refer to:
 Stockmann (surname)
 Finnish department stores
 Stockmann, Helsinki centre
 Stockmann, Tapiola
 Stockmann, Turku

See also
Stockman (disambiguation)